Komandoo as a place name may refer to:
 Komandoo (Lhaviyani Atoll) (Republic of Maldives)
 Komandoo (Shaviyani Atoll) (Republic of Maldives)